Stigmata is the second studio album by Swedish melodic death metal band Arch Enemy. The album was Arch Enemy's first to see worldwide release, in Europe and North America on Century Media Records, and in Japan again on Toy's Factory records. Stigmata features session drummer Peter Wildoer, who had also appeared in Christopher Amott's solo project Armageddon on the 1997 album Crossing the Rubicon, shortly before the recording of the album. The album was reissued on 25 May 2009, featuring a new layout, packaging, and bonus tracks. Stigmata not only contains a title track, but a track named after their previous album as well. The Sri Lankan metal band Stigmata named themselves after this album.

Reception

Stigmata received mixed reviews by critics, who compared it with the previous Arch Enemy album, Black Earth. Jason Anderson of Allmusic noted that "as often happens with highly anticipated follow-ups, Stigmata disappointed some fans with what some called a more restrained sound and lesser material" and criticized the singer Johan Liiva and the addition of the session drummer Peter Wildoer. Nevertheless, Anderson praised Michael Amott stating that "these problems are really minor when balanced against Amott's massive playing and songwriting, so while Stigmata is a fraction off from the band's debut form, Arch Enemy still delivers some nice melodic death metal on the sophomore effort." 

Paul Schwarz of Chronicles of Chaos first noted that "Arch Enemy have made an interesting, and slightly unexpected, progression from their Black Earth debut of two years ago". He commented that the band "have not drawn their 'melody' from pop or even folk" and what characterises the difference between both albums "can be summed up in three words: classic heavy metal." Schwarz finished with a good review writing that "overall Stigmata is a great album and one of the best directions Arch Enemy could have chosen to follow after their critical success with Black Earth."

Critics Paul Schwarz and EvilG mentioned that the sound resembles the Carcass album Heartwork. Schwarz compares it to Black Earth: "Opener "Beast of Man" kicks in with searing riffing and thundering double bass, which creates the false impression that the new material will be far more like the Heartwork era Carcass sound which characterised much of Black Earth.  Arch Enemy have, in fact, gone the opposite way - in terms of heaviness, not quality -, and produced an album which utilises far more melody, especially in its choruses, than BE did." EvilG of Metal Rules praises writing that "I think the reason why this CD is so great is that it has re-captured the Carcass Heartwork sound and feel while at the same time incorporating more melody and even some power metal sounds."

Track listing
All songs written by Michael Amott, except where noted.

Personnel
Personnel credits adapted from the album's liner notes.

Arch Enemy
 Johan Liiva − vocals
 Michael Amott − guitars, co-producer
 Christopher Amott − guitars
 Martin Bengtsson − bass
 Daniel Erlandsson − drums ("Beast of Man" and "Diva Satanica")

Additional musicians 
 Peter Wildoer − drums (all tracks except "Beast of Man" and "Diva Satanica")
 Fredrik Nordström − keyboards, grand piano

Production 
 Fredrik Nordström – producer, engineer
 Göran Finnberg – mastering
 Segerfalk X – original artwork, design, masques design and photography
 Kristian Gunnemo – masques design and photography
 Carl Ljungberg – band photography
 Kris Verwimp – frontcover artwork

References

External links
 Stigmata at Encyclopaedia Metallum
 Stigmata at Discogs

1998 albums
Arch Enemy albums
Albums produced by Fredrik Nordström
Albums recorded at Studio Fredman
Century Media Records albums